Sa Re Ga Ma Pa L'il Champs 2020 is an Indian reality television program scheduled to premiere on Zee TV in 2020. The show is a children's singing competition, spin off from Sa Re Ga Ma Pa. It is being hosted by Manish Paul. Previous editions were judged by Alka Yagnik, Udit Narayan, and Kumar Sanu. Sanu and Narayan has been replaced by Himesh Reshammiya and Javed Ali due to other commitments.

The show is the 8th season of the franchise. Aryananda R Babu was announced as the winner of SaReGaMaPa Li’l Champs 2020, and Ranita Banerjee and Gurkirat Singh became the first and second runner-up of the show.

Auditions
Sa Re Ga Ma Pa L'il Champs 2020 auditions will be held in several major Indian cities, including Guwahati, Kochi, Bhubaneshwar, Goa, Lucknow, Bengaluru, Kolkata, Chandigarh, Indore, Jaipur, Delhi, Nagpur, and Mumbai.

Judges
Initially, Alka Yagnik, Udit Narayan, and Kumar Sanu were announced as the show's judges.

However, due to other commitments, Narayan, and Sanu has been replaced by Javed Ali, and Himesh Reshammiya.

Host
It was originally reported that Jay Bhanushali would host the 8th season of the franchise. Later, Zee TV confirmed that Manish Paul would take the role instead.

Contestants

Winner
Aryananda R Babu

1st Runner Up
Ranita Banerjee

2nd Runner Up
Gurkirat Singh

Other finalists
Zaid Ali
Madhav Arora
Tanishka Sarkar
Saksham Sonawane

Eliminated contestants

Ananya Sharma
Saee Joshi
Radhika Mishra
Somya Sharma
Bobby Verma
Satish Kumar
Hansraj Dash
Dhaani Saikia

Grand jury
The 30 Grand Jury members are as follows:

Aneek Dhar
Abhay Jodhpurkar
Sanchita Bhattacharya
Ram Shankar
Vaishali Mhade
Ami Mishra
Farhad Bhiwandiwala
Bhavya Pandit
Raman Mahadevan
Kiran kamath
Arpita Mukherjee
Sarfaraz Ahme
Vipin Aneja
Rishikesh Kamerkar
Shabbir Ahmed
Hamsika Mani
Padma Wadekar
Pawni Pandey
Arvinder Singh Arv
Vinod Hasal
Suzanne D'Mello
Debojit Saha
Sumedha Karmahe
Sanjeevani Bhelande
Sudhakar Sharma
Qadir Mustafa
Soham Chakraborty
Hrishikesh Chury
Sandeep Thakur
Tuheen Chakravorty
Paroma Dasgupta
Pradip Saran
Ghanshyam Vaswani
Murtuza Mustafa
Sunil Das
June Banerjee
Sairam Iyer
Uvie

Each member of the jury scores the contestant out of 10 points.

Accolades
Sa Re Ga Ma Pa Li'l Champs 2020 won Gold for the best children's promo at Promax India 2020 virtual award ceremony.

Viewership
The show topped in UK on its Grand Finale day with highest viewership among any foreign channels. This made Zee TV No.1 in UK that week.

References

External links

Hindi-language television shows
Sa Re Ga Ma Pa
2020 Indian television seasons
Zee TV original programming